The 13th Parliament of Kenya was elected in the 2022 Kenyan general election.

Composition 
The composition of both chambers is as follows: Azimio la Umoja makes up the majority in the National Assembly, while Kenya Kwanza has the majority in the Senate.

National Assembly

Senate

National Assembly members

Constituency members of parliament

County Women Representatives

Senators

References

See also 

 Parliament of Kenya

Kenyan parliaments
Kenya
2022 establishments in Kenya
Parliament of Kenya